Tan Sri G.K. Rama Iyer (Tamil: ஜி. ராமா ஐயர்) (13 March 1932 – 17 March 2020) was a Malaysian politician, who served as Secretary-General of the Primary Industries Ministry and chairman of Malaysian Airlines. He did much for the civil service in the years following independence.

He was born in 1932 in Penang. His father was V.K. Ganapathy Iyer, a teacher at Penang Free School. Rama himself was educated in Penang Free School.

He was related to Toh Puan Umasundari Sambanthan, through his wife, Puan Sri Vijayalakshmi who is her first cousin. Uma’s husband, Tun Sambanthan is regarded as one of the founding fathers of Malaysia and was a cabinet minister and president of the Malaysian Indian Congress.

He was also the uncle of acclaimed Malaysian theatre personality Huzir Sulaiman. Huzir’s father, former Bar Council president Haji Sulaiman Abdullah (born G. Srinivasan Iyer) and Rama are brothers. Another brother, G. Krishna Iyer, served as headmaster of Penang Free School from 1983 to 1988.

See also
Ministry of Plantation Industries and Commodities (Malaysia)

References

 In tandem with the nation, The Star, August 5, 2007.

1932 births
2020 deaths
People from Penang
Malaysian politicians of Indian descent
Malaysian Hindus